Sunny Doench (born May 21, 1972, Dayton, Ohio) is an American actress. She was reportedly the original choice to play the title character's sidekick Gabrielle in Xena: Warrior Princess, but reportedly declined because she did not want to move away from her boyfriend. She has been married to Nathan John Stricker since August 23, 2014.

Filmography

Film

Television

References

External links
 

1972 births
American film actresses
American television actresses
Living people
Actresses from Dayton, Ohio
21st-century American women